Santo Domingo Tonalá is a town and municipality in Oaxaca in south-western Mexico. The municipality covers an area of  km².
It is part of the Huajuapan District in the north of the Mixteca Region.

Santo Domingo Tonala is located about 50 km from Huajuapan de leon.

Santo Domingo Tonala has been working with its community to maintain its Flora and Fauna by educating schools. Also, along city limits many signs have been posted to encourage people, tourist and surrounding towns to take care of the environment.

Tonala has a small population because many have left the town in search for a better living and education. However during cultural celebration (Fiestas Patronales, many returned to Tonala because it has maintained a rich culture that attracts tourists as well. many of the main celebrations are:
January 7 and 8- Virgen de Juquila
February 2- Dia de la Candelaria
Mayo 3rd and 4th- Santa Cruz
August-Santo Domingo
November 2-Dia de los Muertos
December-Posadas

See also
 Tonalá (disambiguation) for other places with this name

References

Municipalities of Oaxaca